PUD  may refer to:
 Planned unit development
 Public utility district
 Peptic ulcer disease
 Peeled undeveined shrimp
 Polyurethane dispersion